The list of ship commissionings in 1982 includes a chronological list of all ships commissioned in 1982.


See also 

1982
 Ship commissionings